Balboa Heights was more or less part of the Panama Canal township of Balboa, existing on the edge of it towards Ancón, with some of it on the lower slopes of Ancon Hill.  It wasn't really a proper township in terms of having anything other than residential neighborhoods, but it got its own map page in the Canal Zone telephone book. The 1914 Panama Canal Administration Building opened on Balboa Heights which overlooks the port. The Administration Building as extensive Canal art displays.

References 

Panama Canal Zone Townships